Alligator Records is an American, Chicago-based independent blues record label founded by Bruce Iglauer in 1971. Iglauer was also one of the founders of the Living Blues magazine in Chicago in 1970.

History
Iglauer started the label using his savings to record and produce his favorite band Hound Dog Taylor and the HouseRockers, whom his employer, Bob Koester of Delmark Records, declined to record. Nine months after the release of the first album, he stopped working at Delmark Records to concentrate fully on the band and his label.  Only 1,000 copies of the Taylor's debut album were made, while Iglauer took over managing the group.  Other early releases for the fledgling label included recordings by Big Walter Horton with Carey Bell and Fenton Robinson. In 1976, Koko Taylor's I Got What It Takes was nominated for a Grammy Award, and Albert Collins soon signed to the label. Iglauer mainly worked as executive producer.

In 1982, the label won its first Grammy Award for the album, I'm Here, by Clifton Chenier. The second Grammy came in 1985 for Showdown! by Albert Collins, Johnny Copeland, and Robert Cray. In 1991, a 20th anniversary compilation album was issued.

Since its founding, Alligator Records has released over 250 blues and blues/rock albums, as well as a defunct reggae series. Alligator artists include Lonnie Mack, Marcia Ball, Koko Taylor, Lonnie Brooks, Lil' Ed & The Blues Imperials, Eddy Clearwater, Sam Lay, Smokin' Joe Kubek, Roomful of Blues, Eric Lindell, JJ Grey & MOFRO, Lee Rocker, Cephas & Wiggins, and Michael Burks. More recently, veterans Charlie Musselwhite and James Cotton have re-signed to the label.

Alligator celebrated its 40th anniversary in 2011 while reporting a profit for the previous year. In January 2021, Exceleration Records invested in Alligator, becoming a financial and administrative partner with Iglauer. In 2021, Alligator celebrated its 50th anniversary, in observance of which Chicago Mayor Lori Lightfoot declared June 18, 2021 as “Alligator Records Day” in Chicago, and U.S. Rep. Jan Schakowsky added comments on Iglauer's and Alligator's part in the "American cultural legacy of Chicago blues music" to the Congressional Record.

Discography
Alligator Records commenced releasing LPs in 1971 continuing through to the present with a focus on Chicago blues artists.

Blues

Reggae

See also
 List of record labels
 Chicago record labels
 Mutabaruka

References

External links
 Official website

Record labels established in 1971
American independent record labels
Blues record labels
Companies based in Chicago
1971 establishments in Illinois